Qingfengdian is a town under the administration of Dingzhou City in western Hebei province, China, located about  northeast of downtown Dingzhou and just off of China National Highway 107.
Established in 1961, it underwent rural reform in 1982 and 1984 and became a full township in 1997. , the town has jurisdiction over 27 villages.

See also
List of township-level divisions of Hebei

References

Township-level divisions of Hebei
Dingzhou